The following is a list of the leaf beetles recorded in Great Britain. For other beetle families, see the parent article List of beetle species recorded in Britain.

Bruchus atomarius (Linnaeus, 1761)
Bruchus ervi Frölich, 1799
Bruchus loti Paykull, 1800
Bruchus pisorum (Linnaeus, 1758)
Bruchus rufimanus Boheman, 1833
Bruchus rufipes Herbst, 1783
Bruchidius cisti (Fabricius, 1775)
Bruchidius incarnatus (Boheman, 1833)
Bruchidius olivaceus (Germar, 1824)
Bruchidius varius (Olivier, 1795)
Bruchidius villosus (Fabricius, 1793)
Acanthoscelides obtectus (Say, 1831)
Callosobruchus chinensis (Linnaeus, 1758)
Callosobruchus maculatus (Fabricius, 1775)
Macroplea appendiculata (Panzer, 1794)
Macroplea mutica (Fabricius, 1793)
Donacia aquatica (Linnaeus, 1758)
Donacia bicolora Zschach, 1788
Donacia cinerea Herbst, 1784
Donacia clavipes Fabricius, 1793
Donacia crassipes Fabricius, 1775
Donacia dentata Hoppe, 1795
Donacia impressa Paykull, 1799
Donacia marginata Hoppe, 1795
Donacia obscura Gyllenhal, 1813
Donacia semicuprea Panzer, 1796
Donacia simplex Fabricius, 1775
Donacia sparganii Ahrens, 1810
Donacia thalassina Germar, 1811
Donacia versicolorea (Brahm, 1791)
Donacia vulgaris Zschach, 1788
Plateumaris affinis (Kunze, 1818)
Plateumaris braccata (Scopoli, 1772)
Plateumaris discolor (Panzer, 1795)
Plateumaris sericea (Linnaeus, 1758)
Lema cyanella (Linnaeus, 1758)
Oulema erichsoni (Suffrian, 1841)
Oulema melanopus (Linnaeus, 1758)
Oulema obscura (Stephens, 1831)
Oulema rufocyanea (Suffrian, 1847)
Oulema septentrionis (Weise, 1880)
Crioceris asparagi (Linnaeus, 1758)
Lilioceris lilii (Scopoli, 1763)
Labidostomis tridentata (Linnaeus, 1758)
Clytra laeviuscula Ratzeburg, 1837
Clytra quadripunctata (Linnaeus, 1758)
Smaragdina affinis (Illiger, 1794)
Cryptocephalus aureolus Suffrian, 1847
Cryptocephalus biguttatus (Scopoli, 1763)
Cryptocephalus bilineatus (Linnaeus, 1767)
Cryptocephalus bipunctatus (Linnaeus, 1758)
Cryptocephalus coryli (Linnaeus, 1758)
Cryptocephalus decemmaculatus (Linnaeus, 1758)
Cryptocephalus exiguus Schneider, 1792
Cryptocephalus frontalis Marsham, 1802
Cryptocephalus fulvus (Goeze, 1777)
Cryptocephalus hypochaeridis (Linnaeus, 1758)
Cryptocephalus labiatus (Linnaeus, 1761)
Cryptocephalus moraei (Linnaeus, 1758)
Cryptocephalus nitidulus Fabricius, 1787
Cryptocephalus parvulus O. F. Müller, 1776
Cryptocephalus primarius Harold, 1872
Cryptocephalus punctiger Paykull, 1799
Cryptocephalus pusillus Fabricius, 1777
Cryptocephalus querceti Suffrian, 1848
Cryptocephalus sexpunctatus (Linnaeus, 1758)
Cryptocephalus violaceus Laicharting, 1781
Oomorphus concolor (Sturm, 1807)
Bromius obscurus (Linnaeus, 1758)
Timarcha goettingensis (Linnaeus, 1758)
Timarcha tenebricosa (Fabricius, 1775)
Chrysolina americana (Linnaeus, 1758)
Chrysolina banksi (Fabricius, 1775)
Chrysolina brunsvicensis (Gravenhorst, 1807)
Chrysolina caerulans (Scriba, 1791)
Chrysolina cerealis (Linnaeus, 1767)
Chrysolina fastuosa (Scopoli, 1763)
Chrysolina graminis (Linnaeus, 1758)
Chrysolina haemoptera (Linnaeus, 1758)
Chrysolina herbacea (Duftschmid, 1825)
Chrysolina hyperici (Forster, 1771)
Chrysolina intermedia (Franz, 1938)
Chrysolina marginata (Linnaeus, 1758)
Chrysolina oricalcia (O. F. Müller, 1776)
Chrysolina polita (Linnaeus, 1758)
Chrysolina sanguinolenta (Linnaeus, 1758)
Chrysolina staphylaea (Linnaeus, 1758)
Chrysolina varians (Schaller, 1783)
Chrysolina violacea (O. F. Müller, 1776)
Gastrophysa polygoni (Linnaeus, 1758)
Gastrophysa viridula (De Geer, 1775)
Phaedon armoraciae (Linnaeus, 1758)
Phaedon cochleariae (Fabricius, 1792)
Phaedon concinnus Stephens, 1831
Phaedon tumidulus (Germar, 1824)
Hydrothassa glabra (Herbst, 1783)
Hydrothassa hannoveriana (Fabricius, 1775)
Hydrothassa marginella (Linnaeus, 1758)
Prasocuris junci (Brahm, 1790)
Prasocuris phellandrii (Linnaeus, 1758)
Plagiodera versicolora (Laicharting, 1781)
Chrysomela aenea Linnaeus, 1758
Chrysomela populi Linnaeus, 1758
Chrysomela tremula Fabricius, 1787
Chrysomela vigintipunctata Scopoli, 1763
Gonioctena decemnotata (Marsham, 1802)
Gonioctena olivacea (Forster, 1771)
Gonioctena pallida (Linnaeus, 1758)
Gonioctena viminalis (Linnaeus, 1758)
Phratora laticollis Suffrian, 1851
Phratora polaris Schneider, 1886
Phratora vitellinae (Linnaeus, 1758)
Phratora vulgatissima (Linnaeus, 1758)
Galerucella calmariensis (Linnaeus, 1767)
Galerucella lineola (Fabricius, 1781)
Galerucella nymphaeae (Linnaeus, 1758)
Galerucella pusilla (Duftschmid, 1825)
Galerucella sagittariae (Gyllenhal, 1813)
Galerucella tenella (Linnaeus, 1761)
Pyrrhalta viburni (Paykull, 1799)
Xanthogaleruca luteola (O. F. Müller, 1766)
Galeruca laticollis (C. R. Sahlberg, 1838)
Galeruca tanaceti (Linnaeus, 1758)
Lochmaea caprea (Linnaeus, 1758)
Lochmaea crataegi (Forster, 1771)
Lochmaea suturalis (C. G. Thomson, 1866)
Diabrotica virgifera LeConte, 1858
Phyllobrotica quadrimaculata (Linnaeus, 1758)
Luperus flavipes (Linnaeus, 1767)
Luperus longicornis (Fabricius, 1781)
Calomicrus circumfusus (Marsham, 1802)
Agelastica alni (Linnaeus, 1758)
Sermylassa halensis (Linnaeus, 1767)
Luperomorpha xanthodera (Fairmaire, 1888)
Phyllotreta atra (Fabricius, 1775)
Phyllotreta consobrina (Curtis, 1837)
Phyllotreta cruciferae (Goeze, 1777)
Phyllotreta diademata Foudras, 1860
Phyllotreta exclamationis (Thunberg, 1784)
Phyllotreta flexuosa (Illiger, 1794)
Phyllotreta nemorum (Linnaeus, 1758)
Phyllotreta nigripes (Fabricius, 1775)
Phyllotreta nodicornis (Marsham, 1802)
Phyllotreta ochripes (Curtis, 1837)
Phyllotreta punctulata (Marsham, 1802)
Phyllotreta striolata (Fabricius, 1803)
Phyllotreta tetrastigma (Comolli, 1837)
Phyllotreta undulata Kutschera, 1860
Phyllotreta vittula (Redtenbacher, 1849)
Aphthona atratula Allard, 1859
Aphthona atrocaerulea (Stephens, 1829)
Aphthona euphorbiae (Schrank, 1781)
Aphthona herbigrada (Curtis, 1837)
Aphthona lutescens (Gyllenhal, 1808)
Aphthona melancholica Weise, 1888
Aphthona nigriceps (Redtenbacher, 1842)
Aphthona nonstriata (Goeze, 1777)
Longitarsus absynthii Kutschera, 1862
Longitarsus aeneicollis (Faldermann, 1837)
Longitarsus aeruginosus (Foudras, 1860)
Longitarsus agilis (Rye, 1868)
Longitarsus anchusae (Paykull, 1799)
Longitarsus atricillus (Linnaeus, 1761)
Longitarsus ballotae (Marsham, 1802)
Longitarsus brunneus (Duftschmid, 1825)
Longitarsus curtus (Allard, 1860)
Longitarsus dorsalis (Fabricius, 1781)
Longitarsus exoletus (Linnaeus, 1758)
Longitarsus ferrugineus (Foudras, 1860)
Longitarsus flavicornis (Stephens, 1831)
Longitarsus fowleri Allen, 1967
Longitarsus ganglbaueri Heikertinger, 1912
Longitarsus gracilis Kutschera, 1864
Longitarsus holsaticus (Linnaeus, 1758)
Longitarsus jacobaeae (G. R. Waterhouse, 1858)
Longitarsus kutscherae (Rye, 1872)
Longitarsus longiseta Weise, 1889
Longitarsus luridus (Scopoli, 1763)
Longitarsus lycopi (Foudras, 1860)
Longitarsus melanocephalus (De Geer, 1775)
Longitarsus membranaceus (Foudras, 1860)
Longitarsus nasturtii (Fabricius, 1793)
Longitarsus nigerrimus (Gyllenhal, 1827)
Longitarsus nigrofasciatus (Goeze, 1777)
Longitarsus obliteratoides Gruev, 1973
Longitarsus obliteratus (Rosenhauer, 1847)
Longitarsus ochroleucus (Marsham, 1802)
Longitarsus parvulus (Paykull, 1799)
Longitarsus pellucidus (Foudras, 1860)
Longitarsus plantagomaritimus Dollman, 1912
Longitarsus pratensis (Panzer, 1794)
Longitarsus quadriguttatus (Pontoppidan, 1763)
Longitarsus reichei (Allard, 1860)
Longitarsus rubiginosus (Foudras, 1860)
Longitarsus rutilus (Illiger, 1807)
Longitarsus succineus (Foudras, 1860)
Longitarsus suturellus (Duftschmid, 1825)
Longitarsus tabidus (Fabricius, 1775)
Altica brevicollis Foudras, 1860
Altica carinthiaca Weise, 1888
Altica ericeti (Allard, 1859)
Altica helianthemi (Allard, 1859)
Altica lythri Aubé, 1843
Altica oleracea (Linnaeus, 1758)
Altica palustris Weise, 1888
Hermaeophaga mercurialis (Fabricius, 1793)
Batophila aerata (Marsham, 1802)
Batophila rubi (Paykull, 1799)
Lythraria salicariae (Paykull, 1800)
Ochrosis ventralis (Illiger, 1807)
Neocrepidodera ferruginea (Scopoli, 1763)
Neocrepidodera impressa (Fabricius, 1801)
Neocrepidodera transversa (Marsham, 1802)
Derocrepis rufipes (Linnaeus, 1758)
Hippuriphila modeeri (Linnaeus, 1761)
Crepidodera aurata (Marsham, 1802)
Crepidodera aurea (Fourcroy, 1785)
Crepidodera fulvicornis (Fabricius, 1793)
Crepidodera nitidula (Linnaeus, 1758)
Crepidodera plutus (Latreille, 1804)
Epitrix atropae Foudras, 1860
Epitrix pubescens (J. D. W. Koch, 1803)
Podagrica fuscicornis (Linnaeus, 1767)
Podagrica fuscipes (Fabricius, 1775)
Mantura chrysanthemi (J. D. W. Koch, 1803)
Mantura matthewsii (Curtis, 1833)
Mantura obtusata (Gyllenhal, 1813)
Mantura rustica (Linnaeus, 1767)
Chaetocnema aerosa (Letzner, 1847)
Chaetocnema arida Foudras, 1860
Chaetocnema concinna (Marsham, 1802)
Chaetocnema confusa (Boheman, 1851)
Chaetocnema hortensis (Fourcroy, 1785)
Chaetocnema picipes Stephens, 1831
Chaetocnema sahlbergii (Gyllenhal, 1827)
Chaetocnema subcoerulea (Kutschera, 1864)
Sphaeroderma rubidum (Graëlls, 1858)
Sphaeroderma testaceum (Fabricius, 1775)
Apteropeda globosa (Illiger, 1794)
Apteropeda orbiculata (Marsham, 1802)
Apteropeda splendida Allard, 1860
Mniophila muscorum (J. D. W. Koch, 1803)
Dibolia cynoglossi (J. D. W. Koch, 1803)
Psylliodes affinis (Paykull, 1799)
Psylliodes attenuata (J. D. W. Koch, 1803)
Psylliodes chalcomera (Illiger, 1807)
Psylliodes chrysocephala (Linnaeus, 1758)
Psylliodes cucullata (Illiger, 1807)
Psylliodes cuprea (J. D. W. Koch, 1803)
Psylliodes dulcamarae (J. D. W. Koch, 1803)
Psylliodes hyoscyami (Linnaeus, 1758)
Psylliodes laticollis Kutschera, 1860
Psylliodes luridipennis Kutschera, 1864
Psylliodes luteola (O. F. Müller, 1776)
Psylliodes marcida (Illiger, 1807)
Psylliodes napi (Fabricius, 1793)
Psylliodes picina (Marsham, 1802)
Psylliodes sophiae Heikertinger, 1914
Pilemostoma fastuosa (Schaller, 1783)
Hypocassida subferruginea (Schrank, 1776)
Cassida denticollis Suffrian, 1844
Cassida flaveola Thunberg, 1794
Cassida hemisphaerica Herbst, 1799
Cassida murraea Linnaeus, 1767
Cassida nebulosa Linnaeus, 1758
Cassida nobilis Linnaeus, 1758
Cassida prasina Illiger, 1798
Cassida rubiginosa O. F. Müller, 1776
Cassida sanguinosa Suffrian, 1844
Cassida vibex Linnaeus, 1767
Cassida viridis Linnaeus, 1758
Cassida vittata de Villers, 1789

References

Leaf beetles
Chrysomelidae